The Iowa Memorial Union, or IMU, at University of Iowa opened in 1925, the building currently houses a number of student clubs and the Iowa House Hotel.

In 2008, the Iowa Memorial Union's basement was flooded. Recovery efforts have been underway

Referring to the student clubs previously mentioned, the IMU currently houses safe prayer rooms for Muslim students, and the Danforth Chapel is available for Christian worship.

References

University of Iowa campus
1925 establishments in Iowa